Ebrahimabad (also Romanized as Ebrāhīmābād) is a village in Bayat Rural District, Nowbaran District, Saveh County, Markazi Province, Iran. At the 2006 census, its population was 37, in 11 families.

References 

Populated places in Saveh County
Populated places in Iran